Prionovolva brevis is a species of sea snail, a marine gastropod mollusk in the family Ovulidae, the ovulids, cowry allies or false cowries.

Description
The shell size varies between 6 mm and 22 mm

Distribution
This species is distributed in the Pacific Ocean along Japan, Taiwan, the Philippines, Papua New Guinea and New South Wales, Australia and in the Indian Ocean along Somalia.

References

 Cate, C. N. 1973. A systematic revision of the recent Cypraeid family Ovulidae. Veliger 15 (supplement): 1–117.

External links
 

Ovulidae
Gastropods described in 1828